Deborah Ferguson (born in Parkin, Arkansas) is an American politician and a Democratic member of the Arkansas House of Representatives representing District 51 since January 14, 2013.

Education
Ferguson earned her bachelor's degree in interior design from the University of Mississippi and her DDS from the University of Tennessee Health Science Center.

Elections
2012 With District 51 Representative Marshall Wright redistricted to District 49, Ferguson was unopposed for the May 22, 2012 Democratic Primary, and won the November 6, 2012 General election with 6,794 votes (79.2%) against Libertarian candidate Rodger Paxton.

References

External links
Official page  at the Arkansas House of Representatives
Campaign site

Deborah Ferguson at Ballotpedia
Deborah Ferguson at OpenSecrets

Year of birth missing (living people)
Living people
Democratic Party members of the Arkansas House of Representatives
People from Parkin, Arkansas
People from West Memphis, Arkansas
University of Mississippi alumni
University of Tennessee alumni
Women state legislators in Arkansas
21st-century American politicians
21st-century American women politicians